Anna "Asja" Lācis (née Liepiņa; , ; ; October 19, 1891 – November 21, 1979) was a Latvian actress and theatre director.

Biography 
A Bolshevik, in the twenties she became famous for her proletarian theatre troupes for children and agitprop in Soviet Russia and Latvia. She believed that children's theater could be used as the cornerstone for the children's general education, which was especially important with poor, proletarian children who often had little or no other educational opportunities.

In 1922 she moved to Germany where she got to know Bertolt Brecht and Erwin Piscator, to whom she introduced the ideas of Vsevolod Meyerhold and Vladimir Mayakovsky.

In 1924 she met the German philosopher and critic Walter Benjamin in Capri, and the duo would have an intermittent affair for the next several years as he visited her in Moscow and Riga. She has been cited as a factor in Benjamin's embracing Marxism. In 1928, Benjamin dedicated a collection of essays to her.

In 1938 during Stalin's Great Purge she was deported to Siberia. Lācis returned to Soviet Latvia in 1948 and spent her old age together with her husband, the German theatre critic Bernhard Reich. 1948–57 she was the main director of Valmiera Drama Theatre and used the leftist avant-garde technics in her stage productions.

Lācis' granddaughter is the acclaimed Latvian theatre director Māra Ķimele.

References

Sources
(via JSTOR)
(memoirs)
 Ķimele, Dagmāra and Strautmane, Gunta. Asja: režisores Annas Lāces dēkainā dzīve [Asja: The Stormy Life of the director Anna Lāce]. Riga: Likteņstāsti, 1996.
 Asja Lascis, Revolutionär in Beruf: Berichte über proletarisches Theater, über Meyerhold, Brecht, Benjamin und Piscator. Munich: Rogner & Bernhard, 1971.

1891 births
1979 deaths
Latvian theatre directors
Latvian stage actresses
20th-century Latvian actresses
Soviet theatre directors